Crawford County Courthouse may refer to:

 Crawford County Courthouse (Arkansas), Van Buren, Arkansas
 Crawford County Courthouse (Georgia), Knoxville, Georgia
 Crawford County Courthouse (Iowa), Denison, Iowa
 Crawford County Courthouse (Kansas), Girard, Kansas
 Crawford County Courthouse (Ohio), Bucyrus, Ohio
 Crawford County Courthouse (Wisconsin), Prairie du Chien, Wisconsin